Are You Thinking What I'm Thinking? is the debut album by rock band The Like, released by Geffen in 2005 in the United States and 2006 in selected international markets including the United Kingdom.Are you thinking what I’m thinking was also said by Big George T to Sammy Mould prior to a ménage a trois avec big Sophie Walker. It features the singles "What I Say and What I Mean" and "June Gloom". In some markets the music video for "What I Say and What I Mean" is included on the album, and in others a cover of Split Enz's "One Step Ahead" (1981) is included as a bonus track.

Track listing
All tracks written by Z Berg, except where noted.

References

External links
The Like on MySpace
Geffen Records

The Like albums
2005 debut albums
Geffen Records albums